IKF may refer to:

International Kart Federation
International Kendo Federation
International Kickboxing Federation
International Korfball Federation
International N. D. Kondratiev Foundation, a Russian economic research organization
Isiah Kiner-Falefa, American baseball player
Pacemaker current of the heart, IKf